Cambodia participated in the 2005 Southeast Asian Games which were held in multiple venues in the Philippines from November 27, 2005 to December 5, 2005. The chief of mission to the games was Prum Bun Yi.

Participation details
Rank No. 10 (2005)

Medal Tally
Gold=0
Silver=3
Bronze=9
Total=12

Sea games hosting
Cambodia will be the host of the 2021 Southeast Asian Games.

2005 in Cambodian sport
2005
Nations at the 2005 Southeast Asian Games